Daniel Fila (born 21 August 2002) is a Czech professional footballer who plays as a forward for Teplice on loan from Slavia Prague.

Club career
Fila made his professional debut for Zbrojovka Brno in the away match against Jablonec on 5 November 2020, which ended in a win 1–0. In the last minute of injury time he replaced the only scorer of the match Jakub Přichystal.

On 10 February 2022, Fila joined Slavia Prague on a four-and-a-half year deal.

Career statistics

References

External links
 Profile at FC Zbrojovka Brno official site
 Profile at FAČR official site

2002 births
Footballers from Brno
Living people
Czech footballers
FC Zbrojovka Brno players
FK Mladá Boleslav players
SK Slavia Prague players
Association football midfielders
Czech Republic youth international footballers
Czech Republic under-21 international footballers
Czech First League players
FK Teplice players